"Love Power" is the Japanese debut single of Korean boy group The Boss, released on April 13, 2011 on their Japanese label Sony Music Entertainment.

Single information
The single was released in three different versions, including a regular edition, limited edition A and limited edition B. The limited edition A comes with a CD including the same four songs as the regular edition, a deluxe booklet and a DVD. Limited edition B will include a bonus track, but the booklet will not be included. The first set of fans to purchase the regular edition of the single will also receive a pocket calendar.

Track listing

Regular edition / Limited edition A CD

Limited edition B CD

Limited edition A DVD

Charts

Release history

References

2011 singles
2011 songs
Sony Music Entertainment Japan singles

ko:대국남아
ja:大国男児
pt:The BOSS
th:เดอะบอส
zh:大國男兒